DC vs. Marvel (issues #2–3 titled Marvel vs. DC) was a comic book miniseries intercompany crossover published by DC Comics and Marvel Comics from April to May 1996. Each company would publish two issues of the series, thus the title difference between issues #1 and 4 as DC vs. Marvel from DC and issues #2–3 from Marvel as Marvel vs. DC. The series was written by Ron Marz and Peter David, with art by Dan Jurgens and Claudio Castellini.

The special crossover series pitted Marvel Comics superheroes against their DC counterparts in battle. The outcome of each battle was determined by reader ballot, which were distributed in advance to comic book stores.

Plot
Two god-like Brothers who personify the DC and Marvel Universes each become aware of the other's existence, and challenge one another to a series of duels involving each universe's respective superheroes. The losing universe would cease to exist. The story had an "out of universe" component in that the outcomes of the primary battles were determined by the readers' votes.

Numerous smaller, story-driven skirmishes occur throughout the series, not counted with the primary duels meant to determine the outcome between the Brothers.

There were 11 battles fought between the two universes.

The result of the following six battles were determined by the miniseries' creative team:

Aquaman (DC) vs. Namor the Sub-Mariner (Marvel). Aquaman won by summoning a whale to leap out of the water and land on top of Namor. Since Namor is pinned and unable to move, he is declared the loser.
Elektra (Marvel) vs. Catwoman (DC). Elektra won by cutting off Catwoman's whip as she hung from a girder on a building under construction, but Catwoman survived by falling into a dumpster filled with sand.
The Flash (DC) vs. Quicksilver (Marvel). The Flash won using superior speed.
Robin (DC) vs. Jubilee (Marvel). Robin won by using his cape as a decoy and then tying up Jubilee.
The Silver Surfer (Marvel) vs. Green Lantern (DC). The Silver Surfer won when both collided with each other and released a huge explosion which knocked out Green Lantern, but left the Silver Surfer unfazed.
Thor (Marvel) vs. Shazam (DC). Thor won when Shazam was forced to change back to his alter ego of Billy Batson. Billy tried to change back, but Thor used Mjolnir to intercept the lightning bolt that would have transformed him back into Shazam; the resulting impact knocked Billy out and sent Thor's hammer flying off into the distance.

The result of the following five battles were determined by the readers' votes:

Superman (DC) vs. the Hulk (Marvel). After exchanging punches and a burst of heat vision, Superman defeated the Hulk. 
Spider-Man (Marvel) vs. Superboy (DC). With the advantage of his spider-sense, Spider-Man won by tying up Superboy with impact webbing and electrocuting him with high voltage, knocking him out. 
Batman (DC) vs. Captain America (Marvel). The match ultimately ends in Batman's victory – though both are evenly matched after hours of combat, a sudden flushing of the sewer knocks Captain America off balance as Batman manages to strike him with a batarang. Batman rescues Captain America from certain death via drowning, but Captain America's unconsciousness from nearly drowning causes him to lose. As Batman pulls him out of the sewer, he exclaims, "I lost. And may have doomed an entire universe".
Wolverine (Marvel) vs. Lobo (DC). Wolverine beats Lobo in a brutal barfight, which was largely off-panel. 
Storm (Marvel) vs. Wonder Woman (DC). After Wonder Woman drops Thor's hammer in order to allow the fight to happen as it was intended to, Storm won the battle after repeatedly hitting Wonder Woman with lightning after a brief meleé encounter.

Although the final victor of the fights is Marvel, the new character of Access, a man capable of traversing between the two universes, infuses Batman and Captain America each with fragments of their respective universes before the Spectre and the Living Tribunal attempt to create a compromise by fusing the two universes together. This resulted in the creation of the Amalgam Universe, which sees various amalgamated versions of the heroes and villains acting as though they have been in existence for years.

Access is eventually able to find the Dark Claw and Super-Soldier – versions of Batman and Captain America who have been 'amalgamated' with Wolverine and Superman, respectively – and use the fragments of the original universes in them to return the universes to normal. As the Brothers engage in direct battle, the Spectre and the Living Tribunal attempt to stop the conflict, but Batman and Captain America convince Access to take them to the conflict as well. Reading the minds of Batman and Captain America as they try to stop the fight, the Brothers realize that the two men are essentially the Brothers in miniature, each one unique among their worlds, but with no interest in the conflict that the Brothers have engaged in. Realizing the pointlessness of the conflict, the Brothers withdraw and congratulate each other, with both of them saying together "You've done well".

Collected editions
To promote the event, Skybox released a series of trading cards.  

After completion, the series was collected into a trade paperback titled Marvel versus DC/DC versus Marvel (collects the miniseries and Doctor Strangefate #1 (April 1996); 163 pages; September 1996).

See also
 Amalgam Comics
 List of Amalgam Comics characters
 List of Amalgam Comics publications
 JLA/Avengers

References

1996 comics debuts
1996 comics endings
Amalgam Comics
Comics by Dan Jurgens
Comics by Peter David
DC Comics titles
Marvel Comics titles
Intercompany crossovers
Comics about parallel universes
Team-up comics